Timothy Hutchings (born 1974) is an American visual artist living and working in New York City.   He uses a diverse range of media, ranging from video to sculpture to drawing.  Hutchings has exhibited work internationally, notably at P.S.1/MOMA and the New Museum in New York City, Western Bridge in Seattle, the Centro de Arte de Salamanca and Museo de Arte Contemporane in Spain, and the Borusan Cultural Center in Istanbul.  He also constructed the World's Largest Wargame Table for Real Art Ways in Hartford, Connecticut.

Selected videography
 Player vs Player, 2004
 A Lark in the Larkin, 2004
 The Arsenal at Danzig, 2001

References
 Adamson, Glenn, "Timothy Hutchings", NYArts, April 1998
 Amidon, Catherine, "Timothy Hutchings; A Player's Game" catalogue, Real Art Ways, 2006
 Beccaria, Marcella, "The Arsenal at Danzig and Other Views", ARCO, 2001
 Fels, Sophie, "Timothy Hutchings", Artforum, December 2001
 Wilson, Michael, "Timothy Hutchings", Artforum, October 2003

External links
The artist's website
The I-20 Gallery in New York City

American video artists
American sculptors
1974 births
Living people